Philip Marshall (born Joseph Philip Marshall; 1921–2005) was an English cathedral organist and composer. Kenneth Shenton of The Guardian praised his color and improvisational skills.

Marshall was born in Brighouse, Yorkshire. He served in the Royal Army Service Corps during World War II and was elected a fellow of the Royal College of Organists in 1946.

He was the organist at St Botolph's Church, Boston (1951–1957), Ripon Cathedral (1957–1966) and Lincoln Cathedral (1966–1986). At Ripon, he created the cathedral choir school. His compositions included liturgical works, vocal compositions and instrumental works including a Concerto for Piano and Orchestra

He was awarded the BMus and DMus degrees through examination at Durham University, in the years 1950 and 1955 respectively.

References

1921 births
2005 deaths
English classical organists
British male organists
Cathedral organists
20th-century classical musicians
20th-century English musicians
20th-century organists
20th-century British male musicians
British Army personnel of World War II
Royal Army Service Corps soldiers
Male classical organists